The 1990–91 Iraqi National Clubs First Division was the 17th season of the competition since its foundation in 1974. The league title was won by Al-Zawraa for the first time since the 1978–79 season. They also won the Iraq FA Cup to complete the double.

At the halfway stage of the season, the Ministry of Defence decided to dissolve its teams (including Al-Tayaran, Al-Jaish and Al-Bahri) as part of cutbacks following the Gulf War. After protests from supporters, Al-Tayaran were brought back within less than two weeks but under the new name of Al-Quwa Al-Jawiya (meaning Air Force), which was the name the club had used prior to 1974.

Also at the halfway stage of the season, Erbil withdrew from the competition due to the 1991 uprisings in Iraq, so the Iraq U19 team was brought in to play the remaining half of the season.

Name changes
Al-Tayaran renamed to Al-Quwa Al-Jawiya halfway through the season.

League table

Results

Season statistics

Top scorers

Hat-tricks

References

External links
 Iraq Football Association

Iraqi Premier League seasons
1990–91 in Iraqi football
Iraq